In mathematics, the knot complement of a tame knot K is the space where the knot is not. If a knot is embedded in the 3-sphere, then the complement is the 3-sphere minus the space near the knot. To make this precise, suppose that K is a knot in a three-manifold M (most often, M is the  3-sphere).  Let N be a tubular neighborhood of K; so N is a solid torus.  The knot complement is then the complement of N,

The knot complement XK is a compact 3-manifold; the boundary of XK and the boundary of the neighborhood N are homeomorphic to a two-torus.  Sometimes the ambient manifold M is understood to be 3-sphere.   Context is needed to determine the usage.  There are analogous definitions of link complement.

Many knot invariants, such as the knot group, are really invariants of the complement of the knot.  When the ambient space is the three-sphere no information is lost: the Gordon–Luecke theorem states that a knot is determined by its complement. That is, if K and K′ are two knots with homeomorphic complements then there is a homeomorphism of the three-sphere taking one knot to the other.

See also
Knot genus
Seifert surface

Further reading
 C. Gordon and J. Luecke, "Knots are determined by their Complements", J. Amer. Math. Soc., 2 (1989), 371–415.

Knot theory